Daddies is a Philippine television sitcom that aired on TV5 since January 24, 2015, starring Robin Padilla, Rommel Padilla and BB Gandanghari. It airs every Saturday at 8:00pm (PST) after Tropa Mo Ko Unli Spoof.

The sitcom has been picked up for the 2nd Season.

Cast and characters

Main cast 
 Robin Padilla as Apostol "Apol" Pastoran
 BB Gandanghari as Evangelio "Eva" Pastoran
 Rommel Padilla as Versiculo "Ver" Pastoran

Supporting cast 
 Celia Rodriguez as Mommy Vi
 Alice Dixson as Kate
 Francine Prieto as Mrs. Kurosawa
 Dennis Padilla as Coco
 Alberto Bruno as Macoy
 Raniaah Padilla as Baby

Special guests
Cacai Bautista
Ritz Azul
Bentong

International broadcast 
 In the United States, the drama airs in the Los Angeles market free, over-the-air on LA 18 KSCI-TV (channel 18), Mon-Fri 3:00PM, beginning March 1, 2016.
 In Hawaii it airs on KIKU-TV (Oceanic channel 9, Maui 10, Digital channel 89, DirecTV or DISH Network) from Monday-Friday 2-2:30PM beginning August 5, 2016.

References

External links 
 
 

TV5 (Philippine TV network) original programming
Philippine television sitcoms
Philippine comedy television series
2015 Philippine television series debuts
2015 Philippine television series endings
Filipino-language television shows